Cayamant is a municipality in La Vallée-de-la-Gatineau Regional County Municipality, Quebec, Canada. The village of Lac-Cayamant is located at the north end of Lake Cayamant, west of Gracefield.

It was formerly known as the Township Municipality of Dorion, named after Antoine-Aimé Dorion (1818-1891). It was renamed to the Municipality of Cayamant at the end of 1988, due to many problems created by having the identical name to that of the city of Dorion (which merged with neighbouring Vaudreuil in 1994). The new name refers to the largest lake in its territory, Lake Cayamant. The Algonquin term Kakgama, Kandikagamaw, or Kandikagama means "porcupine". Alternatively, it may come from Kantuagama, which means lake with a large bay.

The village has a primary school, a church, and some convenience stores, restaurants and some basic commerce. Most of the population lives near the lake. The most populated street is "Rue Principale" (Main Street).

History

Between 1890 and 1900, a few settlers moved to the shores of Cayamant Lake, becoming home to a flood of French Canadians who were heading to the west of the province in search of farmland.

In 1902, the "Lake Cayamont" post office opened (renamed in 1943 to Lake Cayamant). The Township Municipality of Dorion was formed on October 10, 1906. The first municipal council was elected on October 17, 1906, with Victor Mercier as first mayor, who served until 1923.

In 1918, the parish of Saint-Roch-du-Lac Cayamant was established. In 1988, Dorion was renamed to Cayamant.

Demographics

Private dwellings occupied by usual residents (2021): 460 (out of 1,036 total)

Languages:
 English as first language: 3.7%
 French as first language: 95.1%
 English and French as first language: 1.2%

Local government

List of former mayors:
 Paul Dontigny (1947–1961, 1965–1970)
 Aurèle Rochon (...–2005)
 Suzanne Labelle Lamarche (2005–2009)
 Pierre Pedro Chartrand (2009–2013)
 Chantal Lamarche (2013–2017)
 Nicolas Malette (2017–present)

References

External links

 Official website

Incorporated places in Outaouais
Municipalities in Quebec